The Tanzanian Ambassador in Beijing is the official representative of the Government in Dodoma to the Government of China.

List of representatives

 China–Tanzania relations

References 

Ambassadors of Tanzania to China
China
Tanzania